David Burnet (c. 1803 – June 2, 1853) was a businessman and political figure in Lower Canada.

He was a merchant at Quebec City. He first entered business with his brother Peter, who was involved in the timber trade, importing and ship building. Peter moved to London around 1830 and David replaced him as a director of the Bank of Montreal at Quebec. He had two ships built, one in 1838 and one in 1840, and entered the forwarding business between Kingston and Montreal. In 1832, he was named a warden of Trinity House of Quebec. Burnet was also part owner of a distillery and a textile mill and speculated in real estate. In 1841, he was elected to the Legislative Assembly of the Province of Canada for Quebec City. He was forced to resign his seat in 1843 after business losses forced him into bankruptcy. He continued to operate as a merchant on a smaller scale and buy and sell property after he left politics. 

He died in Quebec City in 1853.

External links
 
 

1800s births
1853 deaths
Members of the Legislative Assembly of the Province of Canada from Canada East
Year of birth uncertain
Politicians from Quebec City